An XML framework is a Software framework that implements features to aid the programmer in creating applications with all data produced in XML. The programmer defines and produces pure data in XML format and the framework transforms the document to any format desired. One code, one XML and several transformations like XHTML, SVG, WML, Excel or Word format, or other document type may result.

Features in an XML framework
 Classes to abstract the USE of XML documents
 Classes to abstract the DATA access - All data is XML independent of your source, like XML, Database, text files
 XSLT cache.
 Easy way to create XSLT documents like code snippets
 Framework must be extensible because XML is extensible by definition.

Examples
 XMLNuke is a pure XML framework
 eXtensible Text Framework is a hybrid XML framework that utilizes XML data, XSLT 2.0, and Java

References

XML